The year 2008 is the 2nd year in the history of the Elite Xtreme Combat, a mixed martial arts promotion based in The United States. In 2008 Elite Xtreme Combat held 12 events beginning with, ShoXC: Elite Challenger Series.

Title fights

Events list

ShoXC: Elite Challenger Series

ShoXC: Elite Challenger Series was an event held on January 25, 2008 at Trump Taj Mahal in Atlantic City, New Jersey.

Results

EliteXC: Street Certified

EliteXC: Street Certified was an event held on February 16, 2008 at BankUnited Center in Miami.

Results

ShoXC: Elite Challenger Series

ShoXC: Elite Challenger Series was an event held on March 21, 2008 at Chumash Casino Resort in Santa Ynez, California.

Results

Strikeforce: Shamrock vs. Le

Strikeforce: Shamrock vs. Le was an event held on March 29, 2008 at The HP Pavilion in San Jose, California.

Results

ShoXC: Elite Challenger Series

ShoXC: Elite Challenger Series was an event held on April 5, 2008 at The Table Mountain Rancheria in Friant, California.

Results

EliteXC: Primetime

EliteXC: Primetime was an event held on May 31, 2008 at The Prudential Center in Newark, New Jersey.

Results

EliteXC: Return of the King

EliteXC: Return of the King was an event held on June 14, 2008 at Neal S. Blaisdell Arena in Oahu, Hawaii.

Results

EliteXC: Unfinished Business

EliteXC: Unfinished Business was an event held on July 26, 2008 at Stockton Arena in Stockton, California.

Results

ShoXC: Hamman vs. Suganuma 2

ShoXC: Hamman vs. Suganuma 2 was an event held on August 15, 2008 at The Table Mountain Rancheria in Friant, California.

Results

ShoXC: Elite Challenger Series

ShoXC: Elite Challenger Series was an event held on September 26, 2008 at Chumash Casino Resort in Santa Ynez, California.

Results

EliteXC: Heat

EliteXC: Heat was an event held on October 4, 2008 at The BankAtlantic Center in Sunrise, Florida.

Results

ShoXC: Elite Challenger Series

ShoXC: Elite Challenger Series was an event held on October 10, 2008 at The Horseshoe Casino in Hammond, Indiana.

Results

See also 
 Elite Xtreme Combat

References

Elite Xtreme Combat events
2008 in mixed martial arts